Dorpat is the old name of Tartu, the second largest city in Estonia. Derived from that, it may refer to:

Bishopric of Dorpat (1224–1558), Prince-Bishopric of Terra Mariana, Holy Roman Empire
Dorpat Voivodeship (1598–1621), voievodeship of Duchy of Livonia, Polish-Lithuanian Commonwealth
Kreis Dorpat (1893–1918), county in Governorate of Livonia, Russian Empire
University of Tartu, previously known as Universität Dorpat (University of Dorpat)
Treaty of Dorpat (1564), treaty between Sweden and Russia during the Livonian War

Dorpat may also refer to: 
Paul Dorpat (born 1938), American historian and photographer

See also
Tartu (disambiguation)